Doron Perkins (born on May 6, 1983) is a former American professional basketball player and currently an assistant coach for Maccabi Tel Aviv B.C. of the Euroleague. Standing at 1.91 m (6 ft 3 in) he can play as either a point guard or a shooting guard. He was the 2009 Israeli Basketball Premier League MVP, and the 2010 and 2011 Israeli Basketball Premier League Defensive Player of the Year.

College career
Perkins played two years of college basketball at Santa Clara University with the Santa Clara Broncos, playing in the WCC, where he was twice selected to the All-WCC First Team (2004, 2005). He also led the league in steals during the 2003–04 and 2004–05 seasons.

Professional career
Perkins started his professional career in the 2005–06 season in the Japanese League, where he played for Toyota Alvark.  He was named the MVP of the league, after leading his team to the championship. In the final game, Perkins had 19 points, 11 rebounds, and 6 assists.

Perkins then signed with the German League club EWE Baskets Oldenburg for the 2006–07 season. He averaged 12 points, 3.8 rebounds, and 4.1 assists in 27 minutes per game. In the 2007–08 season, Perkins led his team, Bree, to the Belgian League's final. He had an outstanding season. He finished the season averaging 15.8 points, 5.3 rebounds, 5.7 assists, and 3.1 steals in 31 minutes per game.

For the 2008–09 season, Perkins signed with the Israeli Super League club Maccabi Haifa. He averaged 17 points, 6.3 rebounds, 5.3 assists, and 3 steals in 31 minutes per game. He had his best game against Ashkelon, finishing the game with 27 points, 7 rebounds, 7 assists, 4 steals, and 2 blocks. He was rewarded for his efforts with the Super League's MVP award. Perkins was named the MVP of his league in two out of his first four pro seasons.

In August 2009, Perkins was invited to join the senior men's Russian national team. As citizenship was a prerequisite to joining the team, Perkins was offered Russian citizenship. He decided however not to take Russian citizenship. 

He then returned to the Israeli Super League, and signed with the league's defending champions Maccabi Tel Aviv. During the 2010–11 season, Perkins earned the nickname "who if not" ("מי אם לא"), due to his uncanny knack for coming up with loose balls, and for the way the Hebrew speaking game announcers constantly used the phrase, "who if not, Doron Perkins". He was the 2010 and 2011 Israeli Basketball Premier League Defensive Player of the Year.

On March 29, 2011, during game 3 of the EuroLeague playoff series between Maccabi Tel Aviv and Caja Laboral, for the ticket to the EuroLeague Final Four, Perkins suffered an injury to his right knee. A medical examination later showed that he suffered two tears in his Meniscus, in his ACL and MCL, and he subsequently underwent surgery to repair the damaged knee. A prognosis of nine months rehabilitation time was published in the media.

In early February 2012, Perkins returned to the court, after nearly one year off from basketball. He signed with the Italian League club Cantù, and played in his first EuroLeague game against Spanish League power Barcelona. Perkins finished the game with 12 points, 7 rebounds, 5 assists, and 2 steals. Perkins was also named the player of the week in his second week in the Italian League.

He then signed with the Ukrainian League club Donetsk. After playing in the Chinese Basketball Association with Foshan Long Lions, Perkins joined the Greek League club Olympiacos in February 2013. With Olympiacos, he won the 2012–13 season championship of the EuroLeague. He was released by Olympiacos in May 2013.

He signed a contract with Beşiktaş Integral Forex on September 30, 2013.

On September 6, 2014, Perkins signed a one-year contract with the Spanish team Laboral Kutxa Vitoria. On December 12, 2014, he parted ways with Laboral. On January 27, 2015, he signed with Krasny Oktyabr of Russia for the remainder of the season. However the next month he was released, before making official debut for the team.

In August 2015, Perkins signed with Turkish club Yeşilgiresun Belediye for the 2015–16 BSL season.

On December 11, 2016, Perkins signed with Sanat Naft Abadan of the Iranian Super League.

On August 18, 2017, Perkins signed with Goyang Orions of the Korean Basketball League.

Awards and achievements

Santa Clara University
2x All-West Coast Conference First Team: (2004, 2005)
West Coast Conference tournament All-Tournament Team: (2004)
2x West Coast Conference Steals Leader: (2004, 2005)

Toyota Alvark
Japanese League Champion: (2006)
Japanese League MVP: (2006)
Japanese League Assists Leader: (2006)

Bree
Belgian League Assists Leader: (2008)
Belgian League Steals Leader: (2008)

Maccabi Haifa 
Israeli Super League MVP: (2009)
Israeli Super League Steals Leader: (2009)

Maccabi Tel Aviv 
2x Israeli Cup Winner: (2010, 2011)
2x Israeli Super League Defensive Player of The Year: (2010, 2011)
Israeli Super League Champion: (2011)

Olympiacos 
 EuroLeague Champion: (2013)

References

External links
Euroleague.net Profile
Eurobasket.com Profile
FIBA.com Profile
Italian League Profile  
DraftExpress.com Profile 
ESPN.com College Stats
TBLStat.net Profile

1983 births
Living people
Alvark Tokyo players
American expatriate basketball people in Belgium
American expatriate basketball people in China
American expatriate basketball people in Germany
American expatriate basketball people in Greece
American expatriate basketball people in Iran
American expatriate basketball people in Israel
American expatriate basketball people in Italy
American expatriate basketball people in Japan
American expatriate basketball people in South Korea
American expatriate basketball people in Spain
American expatriate basketball people in Turkey
American expatriate basketball people in Ukraine
American men's basketball players
Basketball players from Alaska
BC Donetsk players
Beşiktaş men's basketball players
Bree BBC players
EWE Baskets Oldenburg players
Goyang Carrot Jumpers players
Guangzhou Loong Lions players
Israeli Basketball Premier League players
Junior college men's basketball players in the United States
Liga ACB players
Maccabi Haifa B.C. players
Maccabi Tel Aviv B.C. players
Olympiacos B.C. players
Pallacanestro Cantù players
Point guards
Santa Clara Broncos men's basketball players
Saski Baskonia players
Shooting guards
Yeşilgiresun Belediye players